Helmut Swiczinsky, born 13 January 1944 in Poznań, Poland, is an Austrian architect.

Life 
Helmut Swiczinsky studied architecture at the Vienna University of Technology and the Architectural Association in London.

Career 
He founded the Viennese group of architects Coop Himmelb(l)au together with Wolf Dieter Prix and Michael Holzer in 1968. This company is known worldwide for its spectacular buildings. As a major member of this office Mr. Swiczinsky designed a lot of deconstructivist projects.In 2000 he left the company as managing director and in 2006 as partner.

Teaching 
In 1973 he was a visiting professor at the Architectural Association in London. Helmut Swiczinsky is a permanent member of the European Academy of Sciences and Arts based in Salzburg.

Memberships 
Mr. Swiczinsky is a member of the European Academy of Sciences and Arts.

Awards 
Together with his architecture colleague Prix he received, among others:
 Schelling Architekturpreis 1992
 the German Architecture Prize (Deutscher Architekturpreis) 1999
 the Great Austrian State Prize 2000
 the European Steel Award 2001
 Decoration of honor for services to the State of Vienna 2002

Exhibitions 
among others
 1968 Villa Rosa Vienna, Austria
 2012: Coop Himmelb(l)au: 7+, Architekturforum Aedes, Berlin
 2015: Exhibition about Coop Himmelb(l)au in the German Architecture Museum (DAM), Frankfurt, Germany

Literature 
among others
 Kristin Feireiss; Jürgen Commerell: COOP HIMMELB(L)AU. The Vienna Trilogy + One Cinema. Three Residential Buildings in Vienna and a Cinema in Dresden. Berlin 1999
 Peter Noever: Gerald Zugmann - Blue Universe. Transforming Models into Pictures. Architectural Projects by COOP HIMMELB(L)AU. Hatje Cantz Verlag, Ostfildern-Ruit 2002
 Martina Kandeler-Fritsch, Thomas Kramer: Get Off of My Cloud. Wolf D. Prix. Coop Himmelb(l)au. Texte 1968-2005. Hatje Cantz Verlag, Ostfildern-Ruit 2005
 Kristin Feireiss: Dynamic Forces. COOP HIMMELB(L)AU. BMW Welt München. Prestel Verlag, München, Berlin, London, New York 2007,  ISBN 978-3-7913-3875-0.
 Peter Noever: COOP HIMMELB(L)AU. Beyond the Blue. Prestel, München / Berlin / London / New York 2007, ISBN 978-3-7913-3962-7.
 Sylvia Lavin: Central Los Angeles Area High school #9 for the visual and performing arts, HS#9 / CoopHimmelb(l)au. Essay. (Text: Karolin Schmidbaur); Prestel, München / Berlin / London / New York 2010, ISBN 978-3-7913-4433-1.

Buildings and Projects with the Participation of Helmut Swiczinsky 

among others
 Villa Rosa, Vienna, 1968
 Wolke, Vienna, 1968
 Reiss Bar, Vienna, 1977
 Flammenflügel, Technische Universität Graz, happening 9 December 1980, 8.35 pm
 Roter Engel, Vienna, 1981
 Rooftop Remodeling Falkestrasse, Vienna, Austria, 1988
 FunderMax, Sankt Veit an der Glan, Österreich, 1988/1989
 Groninger Museum: Pavillon Bildende Kunst, Groningen, Netherlands, 1994
 Ufa-Kristallpalast auf der Dresden, 1998
 SEG Apartment Tower, Vienna, Austria, 1998
 SEG Apartment Block Remise, Vienna, 2000
 Gasometer B, Vienna, 2001
 Expo.02: Forum Arteplage, Biel/Bienne, Suisse 2002
 Wettbewerbsbeitrag (2. Preis) for the Egyptian Museum, Kairo, Egypt
 Academy of Fine Arts, Munich, 2005
 Büro- und Wohnanlage Schlachthausgasse, Vienna, 2005
 Akron Art Museum, Akron (Ohio), USA, 2007
 Centro Cultural JVC und Restaurant Mosku, Guadalajara, Mexiko
 BMW Welt, Munich, Germany, 2007
 Central Los Angeles Area High School #9, Los Angeles, Kalifornia, United States, 2008
 Seat of the European Central Bank, Frankfurt, Germany
 Musée des Confluences, Lyon, France

References

External links 

 
 
 Coop Himmelb(l)au-Website
 WOLF PRIX, COOP HIMMELB(L)AU: "Architecture is YES!"
 Mittagsjournal 1995.06.03
 Coop Himmelblau, Wien; Offene Architektur / Open Architecture
 Authority data (person): GND: 119305712 | LCCN: nr92000305 | VIAF: 15031103 | Wikipedia people search

Modernist architects
Coop Himmelblau
Austrian architects
Members of the European Academy of Sciences and Arts
1944 births
Living people